Nerkuppai is a panchayat town in Sivaganga district in the Indian state of Tamil Nadu. This is one of the 76 villages of chettinad. The villages and towns near nerkuppai are valayapatti, kadukapatti, Ponnamaravathi

Demographics
 India census, Nerkuppai had a population of 5691. Males constitute 48% of the population and females 52%. Nerkuppai has an average literacy rate of 55%, lower than the national average of 59.5%: male literacy is 66%, and female literacy is 45%. In Nerkuppai, 12% of the population is under 6 years of age.

References

 Villages in Sivaganga district
Cities and towns in Sivaganga district